Lantz Arena is a 5,400-seat multi-purpose arena in Charleston, Illinois. It is home to the Eastern Illinois University (EIU) Panthers men's and women's basketball teams and to the women's volleyball team. Completed in 1967, the Lantz Arena Complex also houses the offices of the EIU athletic department, the Lantz Indoor Fieldhouse, and the Ray Padovan Swimming Pool. The building replaced the Health Education Building (now known as McAfee Gymnasium), which was built in 1938 and is now on the National Register of Historic Places. The arena complex is named for Charles Lantz, longtime football, basketball, and baseball coach of the Panthers.

See also
 List of NCAA Division I basketball arenas

References

College basketball venues in the United States
College swimming venues in the United States
College volleyball venues in the United States
Indoor arenas in Illinois
Basketball venues in Illinois
Swimming venues in Illinois
Volleyball venues in Illinois
Eastern Illinois Panthers men's basketball
1967 establishments in Illinois
Sports venues completed in 1967